Myosin-binding protein C, slow-type is a protein that in humans is encoded by the MYBPC1 gene.

References

Further reading